Theon Cross is a British tuba player and composer.

Background
Born and raised in London to a Jamaican father and Saint Lucian mother, he began taking tenor horn lessons at the age of 8, then switched to tuba when he was in his mid-teens. He studied at the Guildhall School of Music and Drama.

Cross is a core member of the jazz band Sons of Kemet. He has also worked with Moses Boyd and Nubya Garcia in his solo projects. Other collaborators include Jon Batiste, Emeli Sandé, Kano, Lafawndah and Makaya McCraven.

His solo releases include the 2015 EP Aspirations and the 2019 studio album, Fyah. On 29 October 2021 Cross released his sophomore studio album Intra-I.

Discography

Studio albums

Extended plays 
 Aspirations (2015)

Collaborative albums

Singles

References

British jazz musicians
Year of birth missing (living people)
Living people
Sons of Kemet members